Kokak (International title:  The Frog Princess) is a Philippine television drama fantasy series broadcast by GMA Network. The series is based on a comics serial of the same title created by Ruben Marcelino and published in Darna Komiks. Directed by Ricky Davao, it stars Sarah Lahbati in the title role. It premiered on November 14, 2011 on the network's Afternoon Prime line up replacing Pahiram ng Isang Ina. The series concluded on March 2, 2012 with a total of 80 episodes. It was replaced by Hiram na Puso in its timeslot.

Cast and characters
Lead cast
 Sarah Lahbati as Kokak / Kara

Supporting cast
 TJ Trinidad as Carlito "Carl" Asuncion
 JC Tiuseco as Roco Valencia
 Vaness del Moral as Elizabeth Mampusti
 Gary Estrada as Renato Asuncion
 Jessa Zaragoza as Angela Francisco-Asuncion
 Caridad Sanchez as Roberta "Berta" Francisco
 Deborah Sun as Veronica Asuncion
 Frencheska Farr as Raphalyn "Rafa" Valencia
 Ervic Vijandre as Borge Reyes

Recurring cast
 Diva Montelaba as Cheenee Macagaling
 Gian Magdangal as Norman Francisco
 Rox Montealegre as Lileth Zabala
 Shyr Valdez as Bing Altamirano

Guest cast
 Angelika dela Cruz as Vicky Asuncion
 Pen Medina as Isko Pulido
 Ella Cruz as young Kara
 Francis Magundayao as young Carl
 Ella Guevara as young Elizabeth

Ratings
According to AGB Nielsen Philippines' Mega Manila household television ratings, the pilot episode of Kokak earned a 14% rating. While the final episode scored a 19.8% rating.

References

External links
 

2011 Philippine television series debuts
2012 Philippine television series endings
Fantaserye and telefantasya
Filipino-language television shows
GMA Network drama series
Television shows based on comics
Television shows set in the Philippines